Hyalostenele is a genus of moths in the family Geometridae described by Warren in 1894.

Species
 Hyalostenele lutescens (Butler, 1872)
 Hyalostenele oleagina (Warren, 1894)

References

Geometridae